Folke Karl-Gustav Hjort (28 March 1934 – 3 July 1977) was a Swedish actor. A prolific theatre actor of his time, he is now most recognised for his role as Jossi in Olle Hellbom's adaption of The Brothers Lionheart.

He was born 28 March 1934 in Stockholm and grew up in Alingsås.  

He collapsed and drowned 3 July 1977 in a diving accident at Lysekil during a diving trip in the archipelago outside Gothenburg, three months before the latter film's release, which was his last feature film.

Selected filmography
1972 – Skärgårdsflirt (TV)
1973 – Om 7 flickor
1976 – The Man on the Roof
1977 – The Brothers Lionheart

External links

Male actors from Stockholm
1977 deaths
1934 births
20th-century Swedish male actors